SquareMeal is a restaurant review and booking website and smartphone app, with reviews of 5,000 London and UK  restaurants and bars.

The site publishes a yearly restaurant and bar guide and runs the BMW Restaurant of the Year Awards. The 2014 winner was Gymkhana. Previous winners have included The Five Fields in 2013, Dabbous in 2012 and Pollen Street Social in 2011. The award for BMW Square Meal Award for Best UK Restaurant went to Northcote. Previous winners include Purnell's Bistro and The Kitchin.

SquareMeal provides à la carte restaurant bookings in the UK, with users making reservations by telephone, email and online booking.
The website lists over 11,000 bookable restaurants online, in addition to restaurant news, reviews and articles. Diners can review and give restaurants a star rating whilst bloggers can link their blog reviews of restaurants. The site also runs a premium points-based Reward scheme with members receiving points when they book online. Their Concierge service, launched in 2012, allows bookers to find restaurants or venues for private dining.
 
SquareMeal's holding company, Monomax Ltd, is the publisher of printed versions of the SquareMeal Restaurants & Bars Guide and Venues & Events Guide. These are free to qualifying executives in Central London and have a circulation of 104,000. Members also receive a quarterly restaurant and lifestyle magazine and e-newsletters.

Venues & Events
SquareMeal's Venues & Events is a guide and website that provides events professionals with information about venues and events suppliers in London and the UK.

Their annual trade show, Venues & Events Live is held in September at Old Billingsgate Market. In 2013 show drew over 7,000 events organisers.
Members of the SquareMeal venues and events audience receive a quarterly Magazine, e-newsletters and the annual Venues and Events Guide, published by Monomax Ltd. SquareMeal also runs a free helpline to assist events professionals. It handles over £5m of revenue & corporate entertainment enquiries annually.

History

SquareMeal was founded in 1989 by University friends Simon White and Mark de Wesselow,  while working in the City of London.

Connections

The online restaurant booking service is powered by BookaTable (previously known as Livebookings)  and OpenTable.

The site's editor Ben McCormack is a contributor to the Telegraph Luxury magazine.

SquareMeal supports homeless charity  StreetSmart.  The campaign is supported by Richard Bacon  and Stephen Fry and chefs including Angela Hartnett, Marcus Wareing, Jason Atherton and Fergus Henderson.

References

1989 establishments in the United Kingdom
Restaurant guides